WAAC (92.9 FM) is a radio station broadcasting a Country format. Licensed to Valdosta, Georgia, United States, the station is currently owned by the Rivers Radio Group.
It is the Heritage FM station, having been on the air since 1966.

History
The station went on the air as WGOV-FM in November 1966. On February 20, 1984, the station changed its call-sign to the current WAAC.

The "GOV" referred to the fact that it was owned by "Dee" Rivers, son of former Georgia governor E.D. Rivers.

References

External links

AAC
Radio stations established in 1966